The KW Institute for Contemporary Art (also known as Kunst-Werke) is a contemporary art institution located in Auguststraße 69 in Berlin-Mitte, Germany. Klaus Biesenbach was the founding director of KW; the current director is Krist Gruijthuijsen.

KW collaborates with other national and international contemporary art venues, such as MoMA PS1 in New York, the Julia Stoschek Collection in Düsseldorf/Berlin, Mophradat in Belgium, and the Schering Stiftung in Berlin.

History 

The institute was founded July 1, 1991, less than two years after the fall of the Berlin Wall, in a derelict Berlin factory that once produced margarine.  Its founders were Klaus Biesenbach, thena 25-year old medical student, the Swiss actress Alexandra Binswanger, Clemens Homburger, an architecture student, Philipp von Doering, a student of communications design, and Alfonso Rutigliano, an architecture student. The institute's building, which it still occupies, is located at  Auguststrasse 69, in the Mitte district of Berlin. KW's original buildings included the margarine factory and an additional building at its rear that had produced quartz lamps and spray paint. These were leased to the institute in 1991, for 25 years, by the Wohnungsbaugesellschaft Mitte, a local housing association. A dispute over the legality of the leases issued by the Wohnungsbaugesellschaft Mitte and a restitution effort related to the ownership of the buildings between the end of World War II and the establishment of the German Democratic Republic developed in the 1990s. In 1995 a fund associated with the German State Lottery purchased the building and leased it to the institute. The Kunst-Werke part of the institute's name is a play on words, referring literally to artworks and metaphorically to the idea of a public utility that produces art.

Selected exhibitions

37 Räume (1992) 
Exhibition concept of 37 curators at different venues at Scheunenviertel.

Curators: Art in Ruins, Thomas von Arx, Marius Babias, Henning Brandis, Kathrin Becker, Patrizia Bisci, Gunhild Brandler, Wolfgang Max Faust, Peter Funken, Zariamma Harat, Gabriele Horn, Micha Kapinos, Melitta Kliege, Romy Köcher, Maria Kreutzer, John Miller, minimal-club, Bojana Pejic, Jens Petersen, Catsou Roberts, Skúta, Helgason, Aura Rosenberg, Jeannot Simmen, Brigitte Sonnenschein, Beatrice Stammer, Angelika Stepken, Barbara Straka, Julya Theek, Annette Tietenberg, Sabine Vogel, Frank Wagner, Ingrid Wagner-Kantuser, Klara Wallner, Ryszard Wasko, Philipp Weiss, Ingeborg Wiensowski, Wolfgang Winkler, Thomas Wulffen (idea by Klaus Biesenbach).

Territories (2000) 
Artists: AnArchitektur, Matthew Buckingham/Joachim Koester, Multiplicity, Sean Snyder, Stalker, Eyal Weizman/Rafi Segal, Eran Schaerf/Eva Meyer, Jan Ralske, Bureau of Inverse Technology, Amir and Sharon Balaban, Armin Linke, Stalker, Zvi Efrat, Yael Bartana, Danny Bauer and Amos Gitai.

Regarding Terror: The RAF Exhibition (2005)
In 2005, an exhibition on the public perception of the terrorist group Red Army Faction (RAF), curated by Ellen Blumenstein, Felix Ensslin, and Klaus Biesenbach, formed in and through the media caused a major controversy in Germany. Relatives of the terrorists' victims laid out their objections in an open letter to German Chancellor Gerhard Schröder. The exhibition was delayed when the political pressure led Biesenbach to withdraw the museum's application for €100,000 ($133,000) worth of state funding.

Artists: Franz Ackermann, Dennis Adams, Bettina Allamoda, Eleanor Antin, Thomas Bayrle, Sue de Beer, Ulrich Bernhardt, Joseph Beuys, Dara Birnbaum, Klaus vom Bruch, Erin Cosgrove, Lutz Dammbeck, Christoph Draeger, Felix Droese, Heinz Emigholz, Hans-Peter Feldmann, Peter Friedl, Johan Grimonprez, Rudolf Herz, Jörg Immendorff, Johannes Kahrs, Scott King, Scott King/Matt Worley, Martin Kippenberger, Rainer Kirberg, Astrid Klein, Andree Korpys/Markus Löffler, Bruce LaBruce, Claude Lévêque, Theo Ligthart, Jonathan Meese, Michaela Meise, Michaela Melián, Klaus Mettig, Olaf Metzel, Rob Moonen/Olaf Arndt, Hans Niehus, Marcel Odenbach, Sigmar Polke, Yvonne Rainer, Gerhard Richter, Thomas Ruff, Thomas Schütte, Katharina Sieverding, K.R.H. Sonderborg, Klaus Staeck, Stih & Schnock, Frank Thiel, Wolf Vostell, Peter Weibel, Willem (Bernhard Holtrop), and Johannes Wohnseifer.

Into Me / Out Of Me (2006) 
Curated by Klaus Biesenbach, the exhibition Into Me / Out Of Me was co-organized by KW and P.S.1 Contemporary Art Center, the affiliate of Museum of Modern Art (MoMA), New York.

History Will Repeat Itself. Strategies of Re-enactment in Contemporary Art (2007)

Seeing is Believing (2011) 
Artists: Adel Abdessemed, Abbas Akhavan, Kenneth Anger, Nadim Asfar, Taysir Batniji, Adam Broomberg und Oliver Chanarin, Paul Chan, Zeyad Dajani, Anita Di Bianco, Joana Hadjithomas and Khalil Joreige, Khaled Hourani, Iman Issa, Alfredo Jaar, Nedim Kufi, Iñigo Manglano-Ovalle, Gianni Motti, Adrian Paci, Walid Sadek, Taryn Simon, Sean Snyder, Hito Steyerl, and Akram Zaatari.

One on One (2012/2013) 
Artists: Massimo Bartolini, Nina Beier, Joe Coleman, Trisha Donnelly, Geoffrey Farmer, Hans-Peter Feldmann, FORT, Günter K., Annika Kahrs, Robert Kusmirowski, Alicja Kwade, Renata Lucas, Yoko Ono, Blinky Palermo, Anri Sala, Jeremy Shaw, and Tobias Zielony.

Fire and Forget. On Violence (2015)

David Wojnarowicz: Photography & Film 1978–1992 (2019) 
Curated by Krist Gruijthuijsen, KW Institute for Contemporary Art presented the exhibition Photography & Film 1978–1992.

The Making of Husbands: Christina Ramberg in Dialogue (2019)

The Berlin Biennale for Contemporary Art 
The Berlin Biennale is held at various locations in the city, with KW as one of the venues for every edition. The curatorial team of the 11th Berlin Biennale (2020) includes María Berríos, Renata Cervetto, Lisette Lagnado, and Agustín Pérez Rubio.

References

External links
 Official site

Art museums and galleries in Berlin
Contemporary art galleries in Germany
Buildings and structures in Mitte